The Wareru Dhammathat (also known as Wagaru Dhammathat or Code of Wareru) is one of the oldest extant dhammathats (legal treatises) of Myanmar (Burma). It was compiled in the 1290s in Mon at the behest of King Wareru of Martaban. Modeled after the Hindu legal treatise Manusmriti, the Code expounds mostly Pagan era Burmese customary law; it contains less than 5% of the content of the Manusmriti.

The Code was the basic law of the Mon-speaking kingdom until the mid-16th century when it was adopted by the conquering First Toungoo Empire. Translated into Burmese, Pali and Siamese, it became the basic law of the empire. The Code was adapted into the later dhammathats of the successor states of the empire. In Siam, the Code coexisted alongside other Siamese legal codes, and became the core portion of the Siamese Legal Code of 1805. In Burma, the Code was revised "to support Burmese customary law with explicitly Buddhist scriptural justifications" by 1640.

History

Compilation
The dhammathat was compiled at the behest of King Wareru (Wagaru) of Martaban,  1290/91. Wareru, who had proclaimed king of what used to be the Martaban province of the Pagan Empire only since 1287, set out to compile a customary law book in Mon, the main language of his nascent kingdom. He appointed a royal commission, which returned with the legal treatise that came to be known as Wareru Dhammathat and Wagaru Dhammathat ("Code of Wareru/Wagaru"). The compilation was part of a wider regional pattern in which the former lands of the empire as well as its neighboring states produced legal texts modeled after Pagan's, between 1275 and 1317.

Influences
The Code is in part based on the 12th century Pagan period law treatise Dhammavisala Dhammathat. It is mainly Burmese customary law, tempered with Buddhist justifications, and organized in the mold of the ancient Hindu Manusmriti treatise. Like the Manusmriti, it is organized in 18 chapters, and justifies the law as given by Manu, "a sort of Moses-cum-Noah figure who was the first law-giver". But the similarities are superficial. The Code's 18 chapters are not identical to those of the Manusmriti; and its Manu is not the first man of Hindu tradition but a yathei, "who saw the law-book written in large letters on the boundary wall of the world, and recited it to King Maha Sammata," the first king of the world in Buddhist mythology.

Most of the Code is Burmese customary law of the Pagan era. The Pagan customary law itself grew out of the first millennium Irrawaddy valley Pyu and Mon civilizations. According to Huxley's analysis of the four early Burmese dhammathats including the Wareru, the parts borrowed directly from the Manusmriti quantitatively amounted to "between 4% and 5%". Per Huxley, the non-Hindu parts eligible for borrowing amount only to about 10% in any case since "90% of the Manusmriti concerns matters of caste, pollution, ritual, penance that are meaningless in a society unconcerned with caste and uninterested in pollution". The borrowed parts hail from the section called vyavahāra while the discarded parts include Hindu rites and sacraments, purifications and penances as well as marriage, animal sacrifice and "ideas of a sacerdotal nature". Nonetheless the Code is not completely free of Hindu influences; for example, it reiterates "to a certain extent" about the "privileges of the higher castes, of Brahmans" in particular. (These parts would later be viewed as problematic, and be written out in the 17th century.)

Usage
The Code remained the basic law of the Mon-speaking Hanthawaddy Kingdom until the kingdom's fall in 1538/39. It was then adopted by the ascendant First Toungoo Empire. It was translated into Burmese and Pali by Shin Buddhaghosa, a monk. The Code was updated in Burmese as Dhammathat Kyaw. It became the basic law of the empire, which grew to be the largest empire in Southeast Asia during the reign of King Bayinnaung (r. 1550–1581). The Code's adoption in the Tai states in the empire may not have been a stretch. The states had already been using Pagan-derived legal texts since the 14th century.

Even after the empire's fall in 1599, the Code lived on—albeit in adapted forms—in the main successor states. In Siam, it coexisted with other legal codes until King Rama I compiled a new legal code in 1805. The new Siamese law's core 18 chapters share "substantial similarities to King Wareru's code", and the new code adds 21 more chapters. In Burma, the Code morphed into a more Buddhist-centric version by 1640. The new treatise often supports Burmese customary law "with explicitly Buddhist scriptural justifications".

Historiography
The dhammathat was first translated into English in 1892 by Emanuel Forchhammer as "King Wagaru's Manu Dhammasattham". He used a Burmese language manuscript dated 23 September 1707. The British colonial period scholars call the Wareru Dhammathat "the earliest law-book in Burma still extant". But the 12th century Dhammavilasa Dhammathat has been identified as "the oldest extant Burmese law text".

List of chapters
The following is the list of chapters as reported in Forchhammer's 1892 English translation.

Notes

References

Bibliography
 
 
 
 
 
 
 
 
 
 
 
 
 
 

Burmese chronicles
Law of Myanmar
Legal codes
Burmese Buddhist texts
Buddhist law